Spirit, also known as MER-A (Mars Exploration Rover – A) or MER-2, is a Mars robotic rover, active from 2004 to 2010. Spirit was operational on Mars for  sols or 3.3 Martian years ( days). It was one of two rovers of NASA's Mars Exploration Rover Mission managed by the Jet Propulsion Laboratory (JPL). Spirit landed successfully within the impact crater Gusev on Mars at 04:35 Ground UTC on January 4, 2004, three weeks before its twin, Opportunity (MER-B), which landed on the other side of the planet. Its name was chosen through a NASA-sponsored student essay competition. The rover got stuck in a "sand trap" in late 2009 at an angle that hampered recharging of its batteries; its last communication with Earth was on March 22, 2010.

The rover completed its planned 90-sol mission (slightly less than 92.5 Earth days). Aided by cleaning events that resulted in more energy from its solar panels, Spirit went on to function effectively over twenty times longer than NASA planners expected. Spirit also logged  of driving instead of the planned , allowing more extensive geological analysis of Martian rocks and planetary surface features. Initial scientific results from the first phase of the mission (the 90-sol prime mission) were published in a special issue of the journal Science.

On May 1, 2009 (5 years, 3 months, 27 Earth days after landing; 21 times the planned mission duration), Spirit became stuck in soft sand. This was not the first of the mission's "embedding events" and for the following eight months NASA carefully analyzed the situation, running Earth-based theoretical and practical simulations, and finally programming the rover to make extrication drives in an attempt to free itself. These efforts continued until January 26, 2010, when NASA officials announced that the rover was likely irrecoverably obstructed by its location in soft sand, 
though it continued to perform scientific research from its current location.

The rover continued in a stationary science platform role until communication with Spirit stopped on March 22, 2010 (sol ). JPL continued to attempt to regain contact until May 24, 2011, when NASA announced that efforts to communicate with the unresponsive rover had ended, calling the mission complete. A formal farewell took place at NASA headquarters shortly thereafter.

Mission overview

The primary surface mission for Spirit was planned to last at least 90 sols. The mission received several extensions and lasted about 2,208 sols. On August 11, 2007, Spirit obtained the second longest operational duration on the surface of Mars for a lander or rover at 1282 Sols, one sol longer than the Viking 2 lander. Viking 2 was powered by a nuclear cell whereas Spirit is powered by solar arrays. Until Opportunity overtook it on May 19, 2010, the Mars probe with longest operational period was Viking 1 that lasted for 2245 Sols on the surface of Mars. On March 22, 2010, Spirit sent its last communication, thus falling just over a month short of surpassing Viking 1's operational record. An archive of weekly updates on the rover's status can be found at the Spirit Update Archive.

Objectives

The scientific objectives of the Mars Exploration Rover mission were to:

 Search for and characterize a variety of rocks and soils that hold clues to past water activity. In particular, samples sought will include those that have minerals deposited by water-related processes such as precipitation, evaporation, sedimentary cementation or hydrothermal activity.
 Determine the distribution and composition of minerals, rocks, and soils surrounding the landing sites.
 Determine what geologic processes have shaped the local terrain and influenced the chemistry. Such processes could include water or wind erosion, sedimentation, hydrothermal mechanisms, volcanism, and cratering.
 Perform calibration and validation of surface observations made by Mars Reconnaissance Orbiter instruments. This will help determine the accuracy and effectiveness of various instruments that survey Martian geology from orbit.
 Search for iron-containing minerals, identify and quantify relative amounts of specific mineral types that contain water or were formed in water, such as iron-bearing carbonates.
 Characterize the mineralogy and textures of rocks and soils and determine the processes that created them.
 Search for geological clues to the environmental conditions that existed when liquid water was present.
 Assess whether those environments were conducive to life.

NASA sought evidence of life on Mars, beginning with the question of whether the Martian environment was ever suitable for life. Life forms known to science require water, so the history of water on Mars is a critical piece of knowledge. Although the Mars Exploration Rovers did not have the ability to detect life directly, they offered very important information on the habitability of the environment during the planet's history.

Design and construction

Six wheels on a rocker-bogie system enabled mobility over rough terrain. Each wheel had its own motor. The vehicle was steered at front and rear and was designed to operate safely at tilts of up to 30 degrees. Both Spirit and Opportunity have pieces of the fallen World Trade Center's metal on them that were "turned into shields to protect cables on the drilling mechanisms".

The solar arrays generated about 140 watts for up to four hours per Martian day (sol) while rechargeable lithium ion batteries stored energy for use at night. Spirit's onboard computer used a 20 MHz RAD6000 CPU with 128 MB of DRAM, 3 MB of EEPROM, and 256 MB of flash memory. Radioisotope heater units provided a base level of heating, assisted by electrical heaters when necessary. A gold film and a layer of silica aerogel provided insulation.

Communications depended on an omnidirectional low-gain antenna communicating at a low data rate and a steerable high-gain antenna, both in direct contact with Earth. A low-gain antenna was also used to relay data to spacecraft orbiting Mars.

Science payload

The science instruments included:

 Panoramic Camera (Pancam) – examined the texture, color, mineralogy, and structure of the local terrain.
 Navigation Camera (Navcam) – monochrome with a higher field of view but lower resolution, for navigation and driving.
 Miniature Thermal Emission Spectrometer (Mini-TES) – identified promising rocks and soils for closer examination, and determined the processes that formed them.
 Hazcams, two B&W cameras with 120 degree field of view, that provided additional data about the rover's surroundings.

The rover arm held the following instruments:

 Mössbauer spectrometer (MB) MIMOS II – used for close-up investigations of the mineralogy of iron-bearing rocks and soils.
 Alpha particle X-ray spectrometer (APXS) – close-up analysis of the abundances of elements that make up rocks and soils.
 Magnets – for collecting magnetic dust particles.
 Microscopic Imager (MI) – obtained close-up, high-resolution images of rocks and soils.
 Rock Abrasion Tool (RAT) – exposed fresh material for examination by instruments on board.

Mission timeline

2004 
The Spirit Mars rover landed successfully on the surface of Mars on 04:35 Spacecraft Event Time (SCET) on January 4, 2004. This was the start of its 90-sol mission, but solar cell cleaning events would mean it was the start of a much longer mission, lasting until 2010.

Landing site: Columbia Memorial Station 

After the airbag-protected landing craft settled onto the surface, the rover rolled out to take panoramic images. These give scientists the information they need to select promising geological targets and drive to those locations to perform on-site scientific investigations. The MER team named the landing site "Columbia Memorial Station," in honor of the seven astronauts killed in the Space Shuttle Columbia disaster.

"Sleepy Hollow," a shallow depression in the Mars ground at the right side of the above picture, was targeted as an early destination when the rover drove off its lander platform. NASA scientists were very interested in this crater.

First color image 
 
To the right is the first color image derived from images taken by the panoramic camera on the Mars Exploration Rover Spirit. It was the highest resolution image taken on the surface of another planet. According to the camera designer Jim Bell of Cornell University, the panoramic mosaic consists of four pancam images high by three wide. The picture shown originally had a full size of 4,000 by 3,000 pixels. However, a complete pancam panorama is even 8 times larger than that, and could be taken in stereo (i.e., two complete pictures, making the resolution twice as large again.) The colors are fairly accurate. (For a technical explanation, see colors outside the range of the human eye.)

The MER pancams are black-and-white instruments. Thirteen rotating filter wheels produce multiple images of the same scene at different wavelengths. Once received on Earth, these images can be combined to produce color images.

Sol  flash memory management anomaly 
On January 21, 2004 (sol ), Spirit abruptly ceased communicating with mission control. The next day the rover radioed a 7.8 bit/s beep, confirming that it had received a transmission from Earth but indicating that the craft believed it was in a fault mode. Commands would only be responded to intermittently. This was described as a very serious anomaly, but potentially recoverable if it were a software or memory corruption issue rather than a serious hardware failure. Spirit was commanded to transmit engineering data, and on January 23 sent several short low-bitrate messages before finally transmitting 73 megabits via X band to Mars Odyssey. The readings from the engineering data suggested that the rover was not staying in sleep mode. As such, it was wasting its battery energy and overheating – risk factors that could potentially destroy the rover if not fixed soon. On sol 20, the command team sent it the command SHUTDWN_DMT_TIL ("Shutdown Dammit Until") to try to cause it to suspend itself until a given time. It seemingly ignored the command.

The leading theory at the time was that the rover was stuck in a "reboot loop". The rover was programmed to reboot if there was a fault aboard. However, if there was a fault that occurred during reboot, it would continue to reboot forever. The fact that the problem persisted through reboot suggested that the error was not in RAM, but in either the flash memory, the EEPROM, or a hardware fault. The last case would likely doom the rover. Anticipating the potential for errors in the flash memory and EEPROM, the designers had made it so that the rover could be booted without ever touching the flash memory. The radio itself could decode a limited command set – enough to tell the rover to reboot without using flash. Without access to flash memory the reboot cycle was broken.

On January 24, 2004 (sol ) the rover repair team announced that the problem was with Spirits flash memory and the software that wrote to it. The flash hardware was believed to be working correctly but the file management module in the software was "not robust enough" for the operations the Spirit was engaged in when the problem occurred, indicating that the problem was caused by a software bug as opposed to faulty hardware. NASA engineers finally came to the conclusion that there were too many files on the file system, which was a relatively minor problem. Most of these files contained unneeded in-flight data. After realizing what the problem was, the engineers deleted some files, and eventually reformatted the entire flash memory system. On February 6 (sol ), the rover was restored to its original working condition, and science activities resumed.

 First intentional grinding of a rock on Mars 

For the first intentional grinding of a rock on Mars, the Spirit team chose a rock called "Adirondack". To make the drive there, the rover turned 40 degrees in short arcs totaling . It then turned in place to face the target rock and drove four short moves straightforward totaling . Adirondack was chosen over another rock called "Sashimi", which was closer to the rover, as Adirondack's surface was smoother, making it more suitable for the Rock Abrasion Tool (aka "RAT").

Examination of the freshly exposed interior with the rover's microscopic imager and other instruments confirmed that the rock is volcanic basalt.

 Humphrey rock 
On March 5, 2004, NASA announced that Spirit had found hints of water history on Mars in a rock dubbed "Humphrey". Raymond Arvidson, the McDonnell University Professor and chair of Earth and Planetary Sciences at Washington University in St. Louis, reported during a NASA press conference: "If we found this rock on Earth, we would say it is a volcanic rock that had a little fluid moving through it." In contrast to the rocks found by the twin rover Opportunity, this one was formed from magma and then acquired bright material in small crevices, which look like crystallized minerals. If this interpretation holds true, the minerals were most likely dissolved in water, which was either carried inside the rock or interacted with it at a later stage, after it formed.

 Bonneville crater 
On sol  March 11, 2004, Spirit reached Bonneville crater after a  journey. JPL decided that it would be a bad idea to send the rover down into the crater, as they saw no targets of interest inside. Spirit drove along the southern rim and continued to the southwest towards the Columbia Hills.

Spirit reached Missoula crater on sol 105. Missoula crater was not considered a high priority target due to the older rocks it contained. The rover skirted the northern rim, and continued to the southeast.
It then reached Lahontan crater on sol 118, and drove along the rim until sol 120. A long, snaking sand dune stretches away from its southwestern side, and Spirit went around it, because loose sand dunes present an unknown risk to the ability of the rover wheels to get traction.

 Columbia Hills 
  
Spirit drove from Bonneville crater in a direct line to the Columbia Hills. The route was only directly controlled by the engineers when the terrain was difficult to navigate; otherwise, the rover drove in an autonomous mode. On sol 159, Spirit reached the first of many targets at the base of the Columbia Hills called West Spur. Hank's Hollow was studied for 23 sols. Within Hank's Hollow was the strange-looking rock dubbed "Pot of Gold". Analysing this rock was difficult for Spirit, because it lay in a slippery area. After a detailed analysis with the AXPS-and the Mößbauer instrument it was detected that it contains hematite. This kind of rock can  be built in connection with water.

As the produced energy from the solar panels was lowering due to the setting Sun and dust the Deep Sleep Mode was introduced. In this mode the rover was shut down completely during the night in order to save energy, even if the instruments would fail. The route was selected so that the rover's panels were tilted as much as possible towards the winter sunlight.

From here, Spirit took a northerly path along the base of the hill towards the target Wooly Patch, which was studied from sol 192 to sol 199. By sol 203, Spirit had driven southward up the hill and arrived at the rock dubbed "Clovis". Clovis was ground and analyzed from sol 210 to sol 225. Following Clovis came the targets of Ebenezer (Sols 226–235), Tetl (sol 270), Uchben and Palinque (Sols 281–295), and Lutefisk (Sols 296–303). From Sols 239 to 262, Spirit powered down for solar conjunction, when communications with the Earth are blocked. Slowly, Spirit made its way around the summit of Husband Hill, and at sol 344 was ready to climb over the newly designated "Cumberland Ridge" and into "Larry's Lookout" and "Tennessee Valley". Spirit also did some communication tests with the ESA orbiter Mars Express though most of the communication was usually done with the NASA orbiters Mars Odyssey and Mars Global Surveyor.

 2005 

 Driving up to Husband Hill 
Spirit had now been on Mars for one Earth year and was driving slowly uphill towards the top of Husband Hill. This was difficult because there were many rocky obstacles and sandy parts. This led frequently to slippage and the route could not be driven as planned. In February, Spirits computer received a software update in order to drive more autonomously. On sol 371, Spirit arrived at a rock named "Peace" near the top of Cumberland Ridge. Spirit ground Peace with the RAT on sol 373. By sol 390 (mid-February 2005), Spirit was advancing towards "Larry's Lookout", by driving up the hill in reverse. The scientists at this time were trying to conserve as much energy as possible for the climb.

Spirit also investigated some targets along the way, including the soil target, "Paso Robles", which contained the highest amount of salt found on the red planet. The soil also contained a high amount of phosphorus in its composition, however not nearly as high as another rock sampled by Spirit, "Wishstone".  One of the scientists working with Spirit, Dr. Steve Squyres, said of the discovery, "We're still trying to work out what this means, but clearly, with this much salt around, water had a hand here".

 Dust devils 
On March 9, 2005 (probably during the Martian night), the rover's solar panel efficiency jumped from the original ~60%  to 93%, followed on March 10, by the sighting of dust devils. NASA scientists speculated a dust devil must have swept the solar panels clean, possibly significantly extending the duration of the mission. This also marked the first time dust devils had been spotted by Spirit or Opportunity. Dust devils had previously only been photographed by the Pathfinder probe.

Mission members monitoring Spirit on Mars reported on March 12, 2005 (sol ), that a lucky encounter with a dust devil had cleaned the robot's solar panels. Energy levels dramatically increased and daily science work was anticipated to be expanded.
 

 Husband Hill summit 
Here it was found that Husband Hill has two summits, with one a little higher than the other. On August 21 (sol ), Spirit reached the real summit of Husband Hill. The rover was the first spacecraft to climb atop a mountain on another planet. The whole distance driven totaled 4971 meters.
The summit itself was flat. Spirit took a 360 degree panorama in real color, which included the whole Gusev crater. At night the rover observed the moons Phobos and Deimos in order to determine their orbits better. On sol 656 Spirit surveyed the Mars sky and the opacity of the atmosphere with its pancam to make a coordinated science campaign with the Hubble Space Telescope in Earth orbit.

From the peak Spirit spotted a striking formation, which was dubbed "Home Plate". This was an interesting target, but Spirit would be driven later to the McCool Hill to tilt its solar panels towards the Sun in the coming winter. At the end of October the rover was driven downhill and to Home Plate. On the way down Spirit reached the rock formation named "Comanche" on sol 690. Scientists used data from all three spectrometers to find out that about one-fourth of the composition of Comanche is magnesium iron carbonate. That concentration is 10 times higher than for any previously identified carbonate in a Martian rock. Carbonates originate in wet, near-neutral conditions but dissolve in acid. The find at Comanche is the first unambiguous evidence from the Mars Exploration Mission rovers for a past Martian environment that may have been more favorable to life than the wet but acidic conditions indicated by the rovers' earlier finds.

 2006 

 Driving to McCool Hill 
In 2006 Spirit drove towards an area dubbed Home Plate, and reached it in February. For events in 2006 by NASA see NASA Spirit Archive 2006

Spirit's next stop was originally planned to be the north face of McCool Hill, where Spirit would receive adequate sunlight during the Martian winter. On March 16, 2006, JPL announced that Spirit's troublesome front wheel had stopped working altogether. Despite this, Spirit was still making progress toward McCool Hill because the control team programmed the rover to drive toward McCool Hill backwards, dragging its broken wheel.  In late March, Spirit encountered loose soil that was impeding its progress toward McCool Hill. A decision was made to terminate attempts to reach McCool Hill and instead park on a nearby ridge named Low Ridge Haven.

Spirit arrived at the north west corner of Home Plate, a raised and layered outcrop on sol 744 (February 2006) after an effort to maximize driving. Scientific observations were conducted with Spirit's robotic arm.

 Low Ridge Haven 

Reaching the ridge on April 9, 2006, and parking on the ridge with an 11° incline to the north, Spirit spent the next eight months on the ridge, spending that time undertaking observations of changes in the surrounding area.  No drives were attempted because of the low energy levels the rover was experiencing during the Martian winter. The rover made its first drive, a short turn to position targets of interest within reach of the robotic arm, in early November 2006, following the shortest days of winter and solar conjunction when communications with Earth were severely limited.

While at Low Ridge, Spirit imaged two rocks of similar chemical nature to that of Opportunitys Heat Shield Rock, a meteorite on the surface of Mars. Named "Zhong Shan" for Sun Yat-sen and "Allan Hills" for the location in Antarctica where several Martian meteorites have been found, they stood out against the background rocks that were darker. Further spectrographic testing is being done to determine the exact composition of these rocks, which may turn out to also be meteorites.

 2007 

 Software upgrade 
On January 4, 2007 (sol ), both rovers received new flight software to the onboard computers. The update was received just in time for the third anniversary of their landing. The new systems let the rovers decide whether or not to transmit an image, and whether or not to extend their arms to examine rocks, which would save much time for scientists as they would not have to sift through hundreds of images to find the one they want, or examine the surroundings to decide to extend the arms and examine the rocks.

Silica Valley

Spirit'''s dead wheel turned out to have a silver lining. As it was traveling in March 2007, pulling the dead wheel behind, the wheel scraped off the upper layer of the Martian soil, uncovering a patch of ground that scientists say shows evidence of a past environment that would have been perfect for microbial life. It is similar to areas on Earth where water or steam from hot springs came into contact with volcanic rocks. On Earth, these are locations that tend to teem with bacteria, said rover chief scientist Steve Squyres. "We're really excited about this," he told a meeting of the American Geophysical Union (AGU). The area is extremely rich in silica–the main ingredient of window glass. The researchers have now concluded that the bright material must have been produced in one of two ways. One: hot-spring deposits produced when water dissolved silica at one location and then carried it to another (i.e. a geyser). Two: acidic steam rising through cracks in rocks  stripped them of their mineral components, leaving silica behind. "The important thing is that whether it is one hypothesis or the other, the implications for the former habitability of Mars are pretty much the same," Squyres explained to BBC News. Hot water provides an environment in which microbes can thrive and the precipitation of that silica entombs and preserves them. Squyres added, "You can go to hot springs and you can go to fumaroles and at either place on Earth it is teeming with life – microbial life."

 Global dust storm and Home Plate 
During 2007, Spirit spent several months near the base of the Home Plate plateau. On sol 1306 Spirit climbed onto the eastern edge of the plateau. In September and October it examined rocks and soils at several locations on the southern half of the plateau. On November 6, Spirit had reached the western edge of Home Plate, and started taking pictures for a panoramic overview of the western valley, with Grissom Hill and Husband Hill visible. The panorama image was published on NASA's website on January 3, 2008, to little attention, until January 23, when an independent website published a magnified detail of the image that showed a rock feature a few centimeters high resembling a humanoid figure seen from the side with its right arm partially raised.

[[File:Mars Spirit rover's solar panels covered with Dust - October 2007.jpg|thumb|right|Circular projection showing Spirits solar panels covered in dust – October 2007]]
Towards the end of June 2007, a series of dust storms began clouding the Martian atmosphere with dust. The storms intensified and by July 20, both Spirit and Opportunity were facing the real possibility of system failure due to lack of energy. NASA released a statement to the press that said (in part) "We're rooting for our rovers to survive these storms, but they were never designed for conditions this intense". The key problem caused by the dust storms was a dramatic reduction in solar energy caused by there being so much dust in the atmosphere that it was blocking 99 percent of direct sunlight to Opportunity, and slightly more to Spirit.

If the batteries run dry, key electrical elements are likely to fail due to the intense cold. Both rovers were put into the lowest-power setting in order to wait out the storms. In early August the storms began to clear slightly, allowing the rovers to successfully charge their batteries. They were kept in hibernation in order to wait out the remainder of the storm.

 2008 

 Hibernating 
The main concern was the energy level for Spirit. To increase the amount of light hitting the solar panels, the rover was parked in the northern part of Home Plate on as steep a slope as possible. It was expected that the level of dust cover on the solar panels would increase by 70 percent and that a slope of 30 degrees would be necessary to survive the winter. In February, a tilt of 29.9 degrees was achieved. Extra energy was available at times, and a high definition panorama named Bonestell was produced. At other times when there was only enough solar energy to recharge the batteries, communication with Earth was minimized and all unnecessary instruments were switched off. At winter solstice the energy production declined to 235 watt hours per sol.

 Winter dust storm 
NASA officials were hopeful that Spirit would survive the storm, and that the energy level would rise once the storm had passed and the skies started clearing. They attempted to conserve energy by shutting down systems for extended periods of time, including the heaters. On November 13, 2008, the rover awoke and communicated with mission control as scheduled.

Tests on the thermal emission spectrometer indicate that it was undamaged, and the heaters would be enabled with sufficient energy. The solar conjunction, where the Sun is between Earth and Mars, started on November 29, 2008, and communication with the rovers was not possible until December 13, 2008.

 2009 

 Increased energy 
On February 6, 2009, a beneficial wind blew off some of the dust accumulated on the panels. NASA officials stated that this increase in energy was to be used predominantly for driving.

On April 18, 2009 (sol ) and April 28, 2009 (sol ) energy output of the solar arrays were increased by cleaning events.

 Sand trap 
[[File:Spirit Sandbox Setup.jpg|thumb|right|Engineers attempt to replicate conditions in the laboratory of Spirits entrapment on a rock and in fluffy material churned by the rover's left-front wheel.]]

On May 1, 2009 (sol ), the rover became stuck in soft sand, the machine resting upon a cache of iron(III) sulfate (jarosite) hidden under a veneer of normal-looking soil. Iron sulfate has very little cohesion, making it difficult for the rover's wheels to gain traction.

JPL team members simulated the situation by means of a rover mock-up and computer models in an attempt to get the rover back on track. To reproduce the same soil mechanical conditions on Earth as those prevailing on Mars under low gravity and under very weak atmospheric pressure, tests with a lighter version of a mock-up of Spirit were conducted at JPL in a special sandbox to attempt to simulate the cohesion behavior of poorly consolidated soils under low gravity. Preliminary extrication drives began on November 17, 2009.

On December 17, 2009 (sol ), the right-front wheel suddenly began to operate normally for the first three out of four rotations attempts. It was unknown what effect it would have on freeing the rover if the wheel became fully operational again. The right rear wheel had also stalled on November 28 (sol ) and remained inoperable for the remainder of the mission. This left the rover with only four fully operational wheels. If the team could not gain movement and adjust the tilt of the solar panels, or gain a beneficial wind to clean the panels, the rover would only be able to sustain operations until May 2010.

 2010 

 Mars winter at Troy 

On January 26, 2010 (sol ), after several months attempting to free the rover, NASA decided to redefine the mobile robot mission by calling it a stationary research platform. Efforts were directed in preparing a more suitable orientation of the platform in relation to the Sun in an attempt to allow a more efficient recharge of the platform's batteries. This was needed to keep some systems operational during the Martian winter. On March 30, 2010, Spirit skipped a planned communication session and as anticipated from recent power-supply projections, had probably entered a low-power hibernation mode.

[[File:HomePlate.png|thumb|right|Spirits concluding journey around Homeplate and ending location.]]
The last communication with the rover was March 22, 2010 (sol ) and there is a strong possibility the rover's batteries lost so much energy at some point that the mission clock stopped. If Spirit had survived these conditions and there had been a cleaning event, there was a possibility that with the southern summer solstice in March 2011, solar energy would increase to a level that would wake up the rover.

 Communication attempts Spirit remains silent at its location, called "Troy," on the west side of Home Plate. There was no communication with the rover after March 22, 2010 (sol ).

It is likely that Spirit experienced a low-power fault and had turned off all sub-systems, including communication, and gone into a deep sleep, trying to recharge its batteries. It is also possible that the rover had experienced a mission clock fault. If that had happened, the rover would have lost track of time and tried to remain asleep until enough sunlight struck the solar arrays to wake it. This state is called "Solar Groovy." If the rover woke up from a mission clock fault, it would only listen. Starting on July 26, 2010 (sol ), a new procedure to address the possible mission clock fault was implemented.

Each sol, the Deep Space Network mission controllers sent a set of X-band "Sweep & Beep" commands. If the rover had experienced a mission clock fault and then had been awoken during the day, it would have listened during brief, 20-minute intervals during each hour awake. Due to the possible clock fault, the timing of these 20-minute listening intervals was not known, so multiple "Sweep & Beep" commands were sent. If the rover heard one of these commands, it would have responded with an X-band beep signal, updating the mission controllers on its status and allowing them to investigate the state of the rover further. But even with this new strategy, there was no response from the rover.

The rover had driven  until it became immobile.

 2011 

 Mission end 
JPL continued attempts to regain contact with Spirit until May 25, 2011, when NASA announced the end of contact efforts and the completion of the mission. 
According to NASA, the rover likely experienced excessively cold "internal temperatures" due to "inadequate energy to run its survival heaters" that, in turn, was a result of "a stressful Martian winter without much sunlight."  Many critical components and connections would have been "susceptible to damage from the cold."  Assets that had been needed to support Spirit were transitioned to support Spirit's then still-active Opportunity rover, and Mars rover Curiosity which is exploring Gale Crater and has been doing so for more than six years.

Discoveries
The rocks on the plains of Gusev are a type of basalt. They contain the minerals olivine, pyroxene, plagioclase and magnetite. They look like volcanic basalt, as they are fine-grained with irregular holes (geologists would say they have vesicles and vugs).
 
Much of the soil on the plains came from the breakdown of the local rocks. Fairly high levels of nickel were found in some soils; probably from meteorites.

Analysis shows that the rocks have been slightly altered by tiny amounts of water. Outside coatings and cracks inside the rocks suggest water deposited minerals, maybe bromine compounds. All the rocks contain a fine coating of dust and one or more harder rinds of material. One type can be brushed off, while another needed to be ground off by the Rock Abrasion Tool (RAT).

There are a variety of rocks in the Columbia Hills, some of which have been altered by water, but not by very much water.

The dust in Gusev Crater is the same as dust all around the planet. All the dust was found to be magnetic. Moreover, Spirit found the magnetism was caused by the mineral magnetite, especially magnetite that contained the element titanium. One magnet was able to completely divert all dust, hence all Martian dust is thought to be magnetic.  The spectra of the dust was similar to spectra of bright, low thermal inertia regions like Tharsis and Arabia that have been detected by orbiting satellites. A thin layer of dust, maybe less than one millimeter thick, covers all surfaces. Something in it contains a small amount of chemically bound water.

Plains

Observations of rocks on the plains show they contain the minerals pyroxene, olivine, plagioclase, and magnetite. These rocks can be classified in different ways. The amounts and types of minerals make the rocks primitive basalts—also called picritic basalts. The rocks are similar to ancient terrestrial rocks called basaltic komatiites.

Rocks of the plains also resemble the basaltic shergottites, meteorites that came from Mars. One classification system compares the amount of alkali elements to the amount of silica on a graph; in this system, Gusev plains rocks lie near the junction of basalt, picrobasalt, and tephrite. The Irvine-Barager classification calls them basalts.
Plains rocks have been very slightly altered, probably by thin films of water because they are softer and contain veins of light colored material that may be bromine compounds, as well as coatings or rinds. It is thought that small amounts of water may have gotten into cracks inducing mineralization processes).
Coatings on the rocks may have occurred when rocks were buried and interacted with thin films of water and dust.
One sign that they were altered was that it was easier to grind these rocks compared to the same types of rocks found on Earth.

Columbia Hills
Scientists found a variety of rock types in the Columbia Hills, and they placed them into six different categories. The six are: Clovis, Wishbone, Peace, Watchtower, Backstay, and Independence. They are named after a prominent rock in each group. Their chemical compositions, as measured by APXS, are significantly different from each other.  Most importantly, all of the rocks in Columbia Hills show various degrees of alteration due to aqueous fluids.
They are enriched in the elements phosphorus, sulfur, chlorine, and bromine—all of which can be carried around in water solutions. The Columbia Hills' rocks contain basaltic glass, along with varying amounts of olivine and sulfates.Christensen, P.R. (2005) Mineral Composition and Abundance of the Rocks and Soils at Gusev and Meridiani from the Mars Exploration Rover Mini-TES Instruments AGU Joint Assembly, May 23–27, 2005 http://www.agu.org/meetings/sm05/waissm05.html 
The olivine abundance varies inversely with the amount of sulfates. This is exactly what is expected because water destroys olivine but helps to produce sulfates.

Acid fog is believed to have changed some of the Watchtower rocks. Certain places became less crystalline and more amorphous. Acidic water vapor from volcanoes  dissolved some minerals forming a gel. When water evaporated a cement formed and produced small bumps. This type of process has been observed in the lab when basalt rocks are exposed to sulfuric and hydrochloric acids.

The Clovis group is especially interesting because the Mössbauer spectrometer (MB) detected goethite in it. Goethite forms only in the presence of water, so its discovery is the first direct evidence of past water in the Columbia Hills's rocks. In addition, the MB spectra of rocks and outcrops displayed a strong decline in olivine presence,
although the rocks probably once contained much olivine.  Olivine is a marker for the lack of water because it easily decomposes in the presence of water. Sulfate was found, and it needs water to form. 
Wishstone contained a great deal of plagioclase, some olivine, and anhydrate (a sulfate). Peace rocks showed sulfur and strong evidence for bound water, so hydrated sulfates are suspected. Watchtower class rocks lack olivine consequently they may have been altered by water. The Independence class showed some signs of clay (perhaps montmorillonite a member of the smectite group). Clays require fairly long term exposure to water to form.
One type of soil, called Paso Robles, from the Columbia Hills, may be an evaporate deposit because it contains large amounts of sulfur, phosphorus, calcium, and iron.
Also, MB found that much of the iron in Paso Robles soil was of the oxidized, Fe3+ form, which would happen if water had been present.

Towards the middle of the six-year mission (a mission that was supposed to last only 90 days), large amounts of pure silica were found in the soil.  The silica could have come from the interaction of soil with acid vapors produced by volcanic activity in the presence of water or from water in a hot spring environment.

After Spirit stopped working scientists studied old data from the Miniature Thermal Emission Spectrometer, or Mini-TES and confirmed the presence of large amounts of carbonate-rich rocks, which means that regions of the planet may have once harbored water. The carbonates were discovered in an outcrop of rocks called "Comanche."

In summary, Spirit found evidence of slight weathering on the plains of Gusev, but no evidence that a lake was there. However, in the Columbia Hills there was clear evidence for a moderate amount of aqueous weathering. The evidence included sulfates and the minerals goethite and carbonates that only form in the presence of water. It is believed that Gusev crater may have held a lake long ago, but it has since been covered by igneous materials. All the dust contains a magnetic component that was identified as magnetite with some titanium. Furthermore, the thin coating of dust that covers everything on Mars is the same in all parts of Mars.

AstronomySpirit pointed its cameras towards the sky and observed a transit of the Sun by Mars' moon Deimos (see Transit of Deimos from Mars). It also took the first photo of Earth from the surface of another planet in early March 2004.

In late 2005, Spirit took advantage of a favorable energy situation to make multiple nighttime observations of both of Mars' moons Phobos and Deimos. These observations included a "lunar" (or rather phobian) eclipse as Spirit watched Phobos disappear into Mars' shadow. Some of Spirit's star gazing was designed to look for a predicted meteor shower caused by Halley's Comet, and although at least four imaged streaks were suspect meteors, they could not be unambiguously differentiated from those caused by cosmic rays.

A transit of Mercury from Mars took place on January 12, 2005, from about 14:45 UTC to 23:05 UTC. Theoretically, this could have been observed by both Spirit and Opportunity; however, camera resolution did not permit seeing Mercury's 6.1" angular diameter. They were able to observe transits of Deimos across the Sun, but at 2' angular diameter, Deimos is about 20 times larger than Mercury's 6.1" angular diameter. Ephemeris data generated by JPL Horizons indicates that Opportunity would have been able to observe the transit from the start until local sunset at about 19:23 UTC Earth time, while Spirit would have been able to observe it from local sunrise at about 19:38 UTC until the end of the transit.

Equipment wear and failures
Both rovers passed their original mission time of 90 sols many times over. The extended time on the surface, and therefore additional stress on components, resulted in some issues developing.

On March 13, 2006 (sol ), the right front wheel ceased working after having covered  on Mars. Engineers began driving the rover backwards, dragging the dead wheel. Although this resulted in changes to driving techniques, the dragging effect became a useful tool, partially clearing away soil on the surface as the rover traveled, thus allowing areas to be imaged that would normally be inaccessible. However, in mid-December 2009, to the surprise of the engineers, the right front wheel showed slight movement in a wheel-test on sol 2113 and clearly rotated with normal resistance on three of four wheel-tests on sol 2117, but stalled on the fourth. On November 29, 2009 (sol ), the right rear wheel also stalled and remained inoperable for the remainder of the mission.

Scientific instruments also experienced degradation as a result of exposure to the harsh Martian environment and use over a far longer period than had been anticipated by the mission planners. Over time, the diamond in the resin grinding surface of the Rock Abrasion Tool wore down, after that the device could only be used to brush targets. All of the other science instruments and engineering cameras continued to function until contact was lost; however, towards the end of Spirits life, the MIMOS II Mössbauer spectrometer took much longer to produce results than it did earlier in the mission because of the decay of its cobalt-57 gamma ray source that has a half life of 271 days.

Honors

To rover
To commemorate Spirit'''s great contribution to the exploration of Mars, the asteroid  37452 Spirit has been named after it. The name was proposed by Ingrid van Houten-Groeneveld who along with Cornelis Johannes van Houten and Tom Gehrels discovered the asteroid on September 24, 1960.

Reuben H. Fleet Science Center and the Liberty Science Center also have an IMAX show called Roving Mars that documents the journey of both Spirit and Opportunity, using both CG and actual imagery.

January 4, 2014, was celebrated as the tenth anniversary of its landing on many news sites, despite nearly four years since loss of communications.

To honor the rover, the JPL team named an area near Endeavour Crater explored by the Opportunity rover, 'Spirit Point'.

From rover
On January 27, 2004 (sol ) NASA memorialized the crew of Apollo 1 by naming three hills to the north of "Columbia Memorial Station" as the Apollo 1 Hills. On February 2, 2004 (sol ) the astronauts on Space Shuttle Columbias final mission were further memorialized when NASA named a set of hills to the east of the landing site the Columbia Hills Complex, denoting seven peaks in that area as "Anderson", "Brown", "Chawla", "Clark", "Husband", "McCool", and "Ramon" in honour of the crew; NASA has submitted these geographical feature names to the IAU for approval.

Gallery
The rover could take pictures with its different cameras, but only the PanCam camera had the ability to photograph a scene with different color filters. The panorama views were usually built up from PanCam images. Spirit transferred 128,224 pictures in its lifetime.

 Views 

 Panoramas 

{{Wide image|PIA10214.jpg|800px|Spirits West Valley panorama (color not rectificated for media). NASA'S Mars Exploration Rover Spirit captured this westward view from atop a low plateau where Spirit spent the closing months of 2007.}}

Microscopic images

From orbit

Maps

See also

References

External links

JPL, MSSS, and NASA links 
 JPL's Mars Exploration Rover Mission home page
 (obsolete JPL Mars Exploration Rover home page) 
 Planetary Photojournal, NASA JPL's Planetary Photojournal for Spirit
 NASA TV Special Events Schedule for MER News Briefings at JPL
 Mission Status updates from NASA JPL 
 Wikisource:NASA MER press briefings
 MER Analyst's Notebook, Interactive access to mission data and documentation

Other links
 SpaceFlightNow Spaceflightnow.com, Status Page last updated May 2004
 Cornell's rover site: Athena last update 2006
 Finding Spirit: interactive Mars atlas based on Viking images: you can zoom in/out and pan images, to find your preferred site. Spirit approximate position is 14.82°S (= −14.82°N), 184.85°W (= 5.15°E) (not working as of June 4, 2008)
 Google map with Spirit landing site marked
 New Scientist on Spirit Dust Devils , March 15, 2005
 New Scientist on Spirit wheel status, April 3, 2006
 Unmanned Spaceflight.com discussion on Spirit as of 2008-06-04 last updated 2008-06-04
 High-resolution video by Seán Doran that zooms in on Spirits final location
 Archive of MER progress reports by A.J.S. Rayl at planetary.org

 
 

 

2003 robots
2004 on Mars
Aeolis quadrangle
Derelict landers (spacecraft)

Mars robots
Mars rovers
Missions to Mars
Robots of the United States
Six-wheeled robots
Soft landings on Mars
Solar-powered robots
Space probes launched in 2003
Spacecraft decommissioned in 2011
Spacecraft launched by Delta II rockets